, trading as , is a Japanese private railway company that provides commuter and interurban service to the northern Kansai region and is one of the flagship properties of Hankyu Hanshin Holdings Inc., in turn part of the Hankyu Hanshin Toho Group (which includes H2O Retailing Corporation and Toho Co., the creator of Godzilla). The railway's main terminal is at Umeda Station in Osaka. The signature color of Hankyu cars is maroon.

The Hankyu network serves 1,950,000 people every weekday and offers several types of express service with no extra charge.

The head offices of Hankyu Hanshin Holdings, Inc. and Hankyu Corporation are at 1-16-1, Shibata, Kita-ku, Osaka; the both companies' registered headquarters are at 1-1, Sakaemachi, Ikeda, Osaka Prefecture.

The Takarazuka Revue, an all-female musical theatre performance company, is well known as a division of the Hankyu railway company; all of its members are employed by Hankyu.

History

Etymology

 means "express train(s)".

Foundation

On 10 March 1910, Minoo Arima Tramway opened the rail lines from Umeda to Takarazuka (the Takarazuka Main Line) and from Ishibashi to Minoo (the Minoo Line). The tramway was popular due to Kobayashi's pioneering act to develop housing around stations along the line (a first in Japan), a forerunner to transit-oriented developments.

Expansion to Kobe 
On February 4, 1918, Minoo Arima Tramway was renamed .

On July 16, 1920, the Kobe Main Line from Jūsō to Kobe (later, renamed Kamitsutsui) and the Itami Line from Tsukaguchi to Itami were opened.

On April 1, 1936, the Kobe Main Line was extended from Nishi-Nada (present-day Ōji-kōen) to the new terminal in Kobe (present-day Kobe-Sannomiya Station), and the Kobe Main Line from Nishi-Nada to Kamitsutsui was named the Kamitsutsui Line, which was abandoned on May 20, 1940.

In 1936, Hankyu established a professional baseball team and in 1937 the Nishinomiya Stadium as the team's home field was completed near Nishinomiya-Kitaguchi Station. The Hankyu Braves (named in 1947) played until the 1988 season and became the predecessors of the present-day Orix Buffaloes.

Merger and separation with Keihan 
On October 1, 1943, under the order of the government, Hanshin Kyūkō and Keihan Electric Railway were merged, and renamed . The merged lines included the Keihan Main Line, the Uji Line, the Shinkeihan Line (present-day Kyoto Main Line), the Senriyama Line (present-day Senri Line), the Jūsō Line (part of Kyoto Main Line), the Arashiyama Line, the Keishin Line and the Ishiyama Sakamoto Line. The Katano Line was also added in 1945.

On December 1, 1949, the Keihan Main Line, the Katano Line, the Uji Line, the Keishin Line, and the Ishiyama-Sakamoto Line were split off to become part of the newly established Keihan Electric Railway Co., Ltd. Although this revived the former Keihan Electric Railway, Keihan was now smaller than before the 1943 merger, because the Shinkeihan Line and its branches were not given up by Keihanshin. The present structure of the Hankyu network with the three main lines was fixed by this transaction. The abbreviation of Keihanshin Kyūkō Railway was changed from "Keihanshin" to "Hankyū".

Postwar development 

On April 7, 1968, the Kobe Main Line started through service to the Kobe Rapid Transit Railway Tozai Line and the Sanyo Electric Railway Main Line.

On December 6, 1969, the Kyoto Main Line and the Senri Line started through service to the Osaka Municipal Subway Sakaisuji Line. In 1970, the Senri Line was one of access routes to the Expo '70 held in Senri area.

On April 1, 1973, Keihanshin Kyūkō Railway Company assumed its current name.

On April 1, 2005, former Hankyu Corporation became a holding company and was renamed . The railway business was ceded to a subsidiary, now named Hankyu Corporation (before the restructuring, the new company which reused a dormant company founded on December 7, 1989, was called  until March 28, 2004, then  from the next day).

On October 1, 2006, Hankyu Holdings became the wholly owning parent company of Hanshin Electric Railway Co., Ltd. and the holdings were renamed Hankyu Hanshin Holdings, Inc..  Hankyu's stock purchase of Hanshin shares was completed on June 20, 2006.

Rail lines 

Hankyu operates three main trunk lines, connecting Osaka with Kobe, Takarazuka and Kyoto respectively, and their branches.

{{legend-line|#3388cf solid 3px|Kōbe Main Line (Category-1: Umeda – Kobe-sannomiya)'}}

The three groups of the lines, the Kobe Lines, the Takarazuka Lines and the Kyoto Lines, can be further grouped into two, the Kobe-Takarazuka Lines and the Kyoto Lines from a historical reason. Hankyu has two groups of rolling stock, one for the Kobe-Takarazuka Lines and the other for the Kyoto Lines.

 Former lines 
Abandoned lines
Kitano Line (Umeda – Kitano)
Kamitsutsui Line (Nishi-Nada (Ōji-kōen) – Kamitsutsui)

Transferred lines
Keihan Line
Keihan Main Line ( – )
Katano Line ( – )
Uji Line ( – )
Ōtsu Line
Keishin Line (Sanjō – )
Ishiyama Sakamoto Line ( – )
The Keihan and Ōtsu Lines were transferred to Keihan Electric Railway Co., Ltd. which separated from Keihanshin Kyūkō (now Hankyu) on December 1, 1949.

Rolling stock

 
, Hankyu had 1,319 cars for passenger service. Standard cars have three pairs of doors per side and bench seating facing the center of the train (exceptions are noted below). The Kobe Line and Takarazuka Line use the same fleet.

Some former Hankyu trains, such as the 2000 series and 3100 series, have been transferred to the Nose Electric Railway.

Kobe Line/Takarazuka Line
 1000 series
 3000 series
 3100 series
 5000 series
 5100 series
 6000 series
 7000 series
 8000 series (includes small number of transverse seating cars)
 8200 series
 9000 series

Kyoto Line
 1300 series (from spring 2014)
 2300 series
 3300 series
 5300 series
 6300 series (two doors per side, transverse seating)
 7300 series
 8300 series
 9300 series (transverse seating)

Fares
Single fare (adult) in Japanese Yen by travel distance is as follows. Fares for children (6–11 years old) are half the adult fare, rounded up to the nearest 10 yen. 

For fare collection, IC cards (PiTaPa, ICOCA and others) are accepted.

The fare rate was changed on April 1, 2014, to reflect the change in the rate of consumption tax from 5% to 8%, and again on October 1, 2019, from 8% to 10%.

 In popular culture 
A 2-car Hankyu train was featured in the 1988 Japanese animated war drama Grave of the Fireflies.

One 2008 book by the Japanese writer Hiro Arikawa, occurs entirely on the Hankyu–Imazu line, in the north-west suburbs of Osaka, where various characters meet and interact in the trains and at the various stations of the line. It was made into a film in 2011, titled Hankyu Railway: A 15-Minute Miracle''.

The Hankyu 2000 is the locomotive of choice for the main character, Takumi Fujiwara, in Densha de D. A parody of Initial D where the main characters race with trains instead of cars.

See also
Transport in Keihanshin
Hankyu Hanshin Toho Group
Hankyu Hanshin Holdings

References

External links 

Railway companies of Japan
Companies based in Osaka Prefecture
Standard gauge railways in Japan

Railway lines opened in 1910
Midori-kai
Japanese companies established in 1910
Hankyu Hanshin Holdings
Railway companies established in 1910